Nasser Ntege Sebaggala (15 November 1947 – 26 September 2020) was a Ugandan businessman and politician who was Mayor of Kampala from 2006 to 2011. He was an independent presidential candidate in the 2006 general election before dropping out and joining the Kampala mayoral race.

Background and education
He was born in Kampala, Uganda's capital city, on 15 November 1947. Nasser died on 26 September 2020.

Career
Following the expulsion of Asians by Idi Amin in 1972, Nasser Sebaggala acquired a supermarket called UGANTICO on Nkrumah road the lower entrance to current CHAM towers an electronics and clothes store on Kampala Road, the main thoroughfare in Kampala. His business interests grew over time. In 1998, he began his political career by running for the position of Mayor of Kampala. Ostensibly a member of the Democratic Party, Sebaggala won the first direct elections for mayor of Kampala in 1998, beating two government-sponsored candidates. However, he was arrested in the United States two months later, in June 1998, on eight counts of fraud and lying to U.S. customs officials.  In February 1999, he received a 15-month sentence but was paroled in December 1999.  He returned to Kampala in February 2000 to a warm welcome and considered a bid in the 2001 presidential elections.

In mid-December 2005, he broke with the Democratic Party (DP), after he came third in the party presidential primaries, which was won by Ssebaana Kizito, and registered himself as an independent.  A week later, he reversed his decision, withdrawing his candidacy and announcing his support for Kizito. When he lost the Democratic Party nominations to Norbert Mao in 2010, he quit the DP and formed his own party.

See also
 John Ssebaana Kizito
 Erias Lukwago
 Kampala Capital City Authority
 Jennifer Musisi

References

External links
Same Mayor, New Party - Interview With Sebaggala
Seya Insists That MTN Pays Sh8 Billion (Approx:US$3 Million) For His Voice
Seya Wins Custody Battle of Owori Love Child

1947 births
2020 deaths
Mayors of Kampala
Democratic Party (Uganda) politicians
People from Kampala
People from Kampala District
Politicians convicted of fraud
Prisoners and detainees of the United States federal government
Ganda people
Ugandan businesspeople
Ugandan Muslims